Boreray is an uninhabited island in the St Kilda archipelago in the North Atlantic.

Geography

Boreray is formed of a breccia of gabbro and dolerites.

There are two sea stacks, vertical pillars of rock, just off Boreray. Stac An Armin,  to the north, is the taller at 196 metres (643 ft) high, while Stac Lee, 600 m (660 yards) to the west, is 172 metres (564 ft) high.

History
Boreray has the Cleitean MacPhàidein, a "cleit village" of three small bothies used regularly during fowling expeditions from Hirta. As a result of a smallpox outbreak on Hirta in 1727, three men and eight boys were marooned on Stac an Armin off the coast of Boreray until the following May.

There are also ruins of Taigh Stallar (the steward's house). The local tradition was that it was built by the "Man of the Rocks", who led a rebellion against the landlord's steward. It may be an example of an Iron Age wheelhouse and the associated remains of an agricultural field system and two additional possible settlement mounds were discovered in 2011. RCAHMS surveyor Ian Parker said: “This new discovery shows that a farming community actually lived on Boreray, perhaps as long ago as the prehistoric period. The agricultural remains and settlement mounds give us a tantalising glimpse into the lives of those early inhabitants. Farming what is probably one of the most remote – and inhospitable – islands in the North Atlantic would have been a hard and gruelling existence. And given the island’s unfeasibly steep slopes, it’s amazing that they even tried living there in the first place.”

Macauley (1764) reported the existence of five druidic altars in the islands including a large circle of stones fixed perpendicularly in the ground, by the Stallar House.

The islands were bought in 1931 by the ornithologist John Crichton-Stuart, 5th Marquess of Bute. In 1957, following his death, they were bequeathed to the National Trust for Scotland (NTS), the current owner.

St Kilda was inscribed by UNESCO as a World Heritage Site in 1986 in recognition of its Natural Heritage; for its exceptional natural beauty and for the significant natural habitats that it supports. In July 2004 this was extended to include the surrounding marine environment. In July 2005 further recognition for the islands cultural heritage was awarded making it one of only a few places in the world with Dual World Heritage Status for both its natural and cultural significance.

Gallery

Wildlife

Boreray's cliffs are home for various seabirds. In 1959, 45,000 pairs of gannets were counted on the island and the two stacks. There are also over 130 different varieties of flowering plant on the island.

The island is also the home to an extremely rare breed of sheep, the Boreray, sometimes also called the Boreray Blackface or Hebridean Blackface. They are not to be confused with the Soay sheep, also originating from the St. Kilda archipelagos. They are small horned sheep and are the rarest breed of sheep in the UK.

See also

 List of islands of Scotland
 List of outlying islands of Scotland

Footnotes

References
 Fleming, Andrew (2005) St. Kilda and the Wider World: Tales of an Iconic Island, Windgather Press 

 Maclean, Charles (1977) Island on the Edge of the World: the Story of St. Kilda, Edinburgh, Canongate 

St Kilda, Scotland
Seabird colonies
Uninhabited islands of the Outer Hebrides
Marilyns of Scotland